The 1974 World Orienteering Championships, the 5th World Orienteering Championships, were held in Viborg, Denmark, 20–22 September 1974.

The championships had four events; individual contests for men and women, and relays for men and women.

Medalists

Results

Men's individual

Women's individual

References 

World Orienteering Championships
1974 in Danish sport
International sports competitions hosted by Denmark
September 1974 sports events in Europe
Orienteering in Denmark
Sport in Silkeborg